Attack of the Wolf King is the fifth studio album from Haste the Day. The album was released on June 29, 2010 through Solid State Records. A song from the album, entitled "Travesty" was released on the band's MySpace on May 4. Lyrics for "Travesty" were released on May 21, 2010 on the band's Facebook. The song "Dog Like Vultures" has been played live since early April and debuted April 8 in Evansville, IN. This is the first album to feature new members, Dave Krysl, Giuseppe Capolupo, and Scott Whelan. On the CD's release day, the band played a show in Bloomington, IN, where they performed an extended setlist with all the former members of the band, playing songs from the That They May Know You EP through Attack of the Wolf King. On June 8 the band released the song "Wake Up The Sun" on their Myspace.

On August 10, 2010, CI Records released a 7-inch vinyl single of "Travesty" with two other tracks from the album. The release was limited to 1000 copies on swirl colored vinyl.

Track listing

Personnel 
Haste the Day
 Stephen Keech – lead vocals
 Michael Murphy – bass guitar, vocals
 Dave Krysl – lead guitar
 Scott Whelan – rhythm guitar, vocals
 Giuseppe "Gypsy" Capolupo – drums, percussion

Former members
 Brennan Chaulk - rhythm guitar, vocals
 Matt Marquez - drums
 Blake Martin - rhythm guitar

Guest vocals
 Micah Kinard of Oh, Sleeper

Production
 Andreas Lars Magnusson – producer and engineering
 Brian "Bone" Thorburn – producer and engineering (Meet Me Half Way only)
 Jason Suecof – mixing
 Recorded at Azmyth Recording (Andreas' Home Studio), Richmond, Virginia
 Recorded at Threshold Studios (Bone's Home Studio), Indianapolis, Indiana (Meet Me Half Way only)
 Jon Dunn – A&R

References 

2010 albums
Haste the Day albums
Solid State Records albums